Zohaib Khan (born 20 March 1984) is a Pakistani former cricketer. On 4 November 2018, batting for Habib Bank Limited, he was named the man of the match in the final of the 2018–19 Quaid-e-Azam One Day Cup, with Habib Bank winning the tournament. In March 2019, he was named in Khyber Pakhtunkhwa's squad for the 2019 Pakistan Cup.

In September 2019, he was named in Khyber Pakhtunkhwa's squad for the 2019–20 Quaid-e-Azam Trophy tournament. In February 2021, he began to undertake coaching courses with the Pakistan Cricket Board.

References

External links
 

1984 births
Living people
Pakistani cricketers
Khyber Pakhtunkhwa cricketers
Lahore cricketers
Peshawar cricketers
Cricketers from Peshawar
Lahore Qalandars cricketers
Islamabad United cricketers
Habib Bank Limited cricketers